The 64th New York Infantry Regiment, the "First Cattaraugus Regiment", was an infantry regiment of the Union Army during the American Civil War.

Service
The regiment was organized on November 13, 1861 by the state of New York. Since December 1861, it was in the federal service. It left the state on December 10 of the same year. In 1864, its term expired, the servicemen were discharged in September and October that year, and the regiment was reorganized into a battalion of six companies, for which new people were recruited. The regiment was finally honorably discharged on July 14, 1865. It lost in total 18 officers and 283 enlisted men.

Between December 1861 and July 1865, the regiment was a part of the Army of the Potomac.

Commanders
Colonel Thomas J. Parker
 Colonel Daniel C. Bingham
 Colonel Leman W. Bradley
 Colonel William Glenny

See also

List of New York Civil War regiments

Notes

References
The Civil War Archive

External links
 National Park Service UNION NEW YORK VOLUNTEERS 64th Regiment, New York Infantry
 Antietam on the Web Federal Regiment64th New York Infantry

Infantry 064
1861 establishments in New York (state)
Military units and formations established in 1861
Military units and formations disestablished in 1865